The Harrow and Uxbridge Railway Act 1897 was enabling legislation to allow the creation of the Harrow and Uxbridge Railway. It received royal assent on 6 August 1897.

References 

United Kingdom Acts of Parliament 1897
1897 in rail transport
Railway Acts
19th century in Middlesex